Alexander I. Barvinok (born March 27, 1963) is a professor of mathematics at the University of Michigan.

Barvinok received his Ph.D. from St. Petersburg State University in 1988 under the supervision of Anatoly Moiseevich Vershik.

In 1999 Barvinok received the Presidential Early Career Award for Scientists and Engineers (PECASE) from President Bill Clinton.

Barvinok gave an invited talk at the 2006 International Congress of Mathematicians in Madrid.

In 2012, Barvinok became a Fellow of the American Mathematical Society.

References

Living people
Fellows of the American Mathematical Society
20th-century American mathematicians
21st-century American mathematicians
Russian mathematicians
University of Michigan faculty
Combinatorialists
Recipients of the Presidential Early Career Award for Scientists and Engineers
1963 births